Vanessa Palomar Sarno (born September 28, 2003) is a Filipino weightlifter who has competed in the Asian Championships.

Early career and education
Sarno was born on September 28, 2003 and was the second of four children. Her parents work as fishers for their family's livelihood. Sarno took up weightlifting after she joined her cousins train in a gymnasium in their home province of Bohol. She then developed a hobby of lifting barbells. She was also influenced to take up the sport at 9 years old by her father, who also competed as a powerlifter in his youth. She also attended the Bohol Institute of Technology in Tagbilaran for her secondary education.

At a young age, she joined the Philippine Sports Commission-organized 2014 Batang Pinoy which was hosted in Bacolod, where she won a gold medal in the -32kg category.

Career
Sarno went on to represent the Philippines in international competitions, joining weightlifting competitions in Indonesia in 2015, and in Thailand in 2018. At the 2019 Asian Youth and Junior Championships in North Korea, she clinched two golds (overall and snatch) and one silver (clean and jerk) in the 71-kg division. She also joined the 2020 IWF Online World Youth Championship hosted by Peru where she won three gold medals (snatch, clean and jerk, and overall) in the 71-kg division.

At the 2020 Asian Weightlifting Championships in Tashkent, Uzbekistan, which was delayed by a year due to the COVID-19 pandemic, Sarno clinched the gold medal in the -71kg category, and also won two small medals; a gold for the clean and jerk and a silver for the snatch. After the tournament, she has been touted by local sports officials as a "successor" of Olympian Hidilyn Diaz and is seen as one of the Filipino contenders to qualify for the 2024 Summer Olympics in Paris. Although the national weightlifting federation, the Samahang Weightlifting ng Pilipinas, began lobbying for Sarno's entry to the 2020 Summer Olympics in Tokyo as a wild card.

Major results

References

Living people

2003 births
Sportspeople from Bohol
Filipino female weightlifters
Southeast Asian Games gold medalists for the Philippines
Southeast Asian Games medalists in weightlifting
Competitors at the 2021 Southeast Asian Games
21st-century Filipino women